The Sandwich Fault Zone is a fault zone that runs northwest from Oswego to Ogle County, transecting Lee County  in Northern Illinois. The fault has generally not been active, although there was a minor earthquake in 2002, and another, slightly larger one, in 2010.  It has a largely 400 to 600-foot vertical displacement, although parts can reach up to an 800-foot displacement, and is likely a configuration of several smaller faults, varying in both direction and displacement.

See also
 List of earthquakes in Illinois

Notes

References
 

Earthquakes in Illinois
Geography of DeKalb County, Illinois
Geography of Kendall County, Illinois
Geography of LaSalle County, Illinois
Geography of Lee County, Illinois
Geography of Ogle County, Illinois
Sandwich, Illinois